Negrita Jayde (July 5, 1958August 28, 2009) was a Canadian female bodybuilding champion, personal trainer, author, actress and businesswoman. She was the longtime partner and fiancée of Gregory Hines at the time of his death in August 2003. Her books include Supervixen: Secrets for Building a Lean and Sexy Body (1995).

Death
Jayde died aged 51 on August 28, 2009, having been ill with cancer. She is buried next to Hines at St. Volodymyr Ukrainian Cemetery in Oakville, Ontario.

References

External links
 Negrita Jayde Photo Gallery
 
 

1958 births
2009 deaths
Canadian female bodybuilders
Place of birth missing
Place of death missing
Canadian television personalities
Canadian women television personalities
Canadian people of Ukrainian descent